The following events occurred in February 1927:

February 1, 1927 (Tuesday)
In its third year of conferring B.A. degrees, the "Southern Branch of the University of California" formally changed to its present name to the University of California at Los Angeles, more commonly referred to as UCLA. 
The first seaside resort hotel in Hawaii, the Royal Hawaiian Hotel opened for business.  Now called the "Pink Palace", the hotel originally owned  of land in Honolulu at Waikiki.
On the same day, the first and only luxury hotel in Death Valley National Park— originally called The Furnace Creek Inn, and later the Oasis at Death Valley— opened in the California desert.
Born: Galway Kinnell, American poet, in Providence, Rhode Island (d. 2014)
Died:  Sir George Higginson, 100, British general and Crimean War hero

February 2, 1927 (Wednesday)
After ax murderer George J. Hassell gave directions, police in Whittier, California unearthed the bodies of his wife and three children.  Hassell on death row in Texas for the murder there of a second wife and eight other children, earned a postponement of his February 27 execution date.
The Ziegfeld Theatre opened on Broadway with the production Rio Rita.  The building was razed in 1967
Born: Stan Getz, American jazz saxophonist, in Philadelphia (d. 1991)

February 3, 1927 (Thursday)
A revolt against the government of Portugal broke out at Oporto.  After six days of fighting, and at least 120 deaths, the rebels surrendered after it appeared that Oporto would be destroyed by heavy artillery.  More than 600 conspirators and participants were exiled to Portugal's colonies in the Azores and Cape Verde.
The 4th Regiment of the United States Marines, with 1,200 men, was dispatched from San Diego to protect Americans in Shanghai.   After arriving on the transport USS Chaumont on February 27, the unit continued its presence in Shanghai until 1941.
The Brazilian airline VARIG (Viação Aérea Rio-Grandense) began operations.
William Phillips was named as the first U.S. Minister to Canada, and Frederick A. Sterling was named as the first United States Ambassador to Ireland.  Prior to 1927, diplomatic relations with Canada and the Irish Free State had been conducted directly with the United Kingdom.
Born:  
Val Doonican, Irish singer and TV personality, in Waterford (d. 2015)
Blas Ople, Philippine Secretary of Foreign Affairs from 2002 until his death in 2003; in Hagonoy (d. 2003)

February 4, 1927 (Friday)
Driving the Napier-Campbell Blue Bird, Campbell averaged 174.883 mph (281.447 km/h).
U.S. Senator Matthew M. Neely (D-WV) introduced a bill in the Senate to provide a $5,000,000 reward to the discoverer of a cure for cancer.  Neely would die of cancer on January 18, 1958, after his own 15-month battle with the disease.

February 5, 1927 (Saturday)
The Royal Australasian College of Surgeons (RACS), described as "a non-profit organisation training surgeons and maintaining surgical standards in Australia and New Zealand", was founded.
The United States Tennis Association dropped its 1926 national champion, Vincent Richards, from its rankings after Richards became the most famous player to that time to turn professional.  Bill Tilden, at that time still an amateur, replaced Richards at #1 in the rankings.

February 6, 1927 (Sunday)
In Nicaragua, a force of 1,500 rebels captured the city of Chinandega and burned the city, at one time the national capital. Government troops retook the town after a battle of five days.  Reportedly, 300 people were killed and 500 were wounded.  At the request of President Adolfo Díaz,  the United States sent troops to Chinandega.

February 7, 1927 (Monday)
The first revision of the Book of Common Prayer since 1662 was introduced at 3:00 pm at Westminster Abbey.  The Archbishop of Canterbury received the proposed revisions for a new prayer book for the Church of England, "the outcome of sixty years of study and effort designed to make the church services richer and more elastic".  The new book quickly became a bestseller for Anglicans and Episcopalians worldwide, but failed to receive the required approval.  The House of Commons twice voted against a bill to accept the new text, a resolution that would still have required the approval of the House of Lords and royal assent by the King in his capacity as Supreme Governor of the Church of England.
Born:  
Vladimir Kuts, Ukrainian Soviet distance runner, 1956 Olympic gold for 5,000m (world record holder 1957–65) and 10,000 m, (world record holder 1956–60)(committed suicide, 1975) 
Juliette Gréco, French singer, in Montpellier (d. 2020)

February 8, 1927 (Tuesday)

In what the American press described as "the most pretentious funeral in the history of the Orient", the Emperor Taishō, known in the West as Yoshihito, was buried after being mourned by his 80,000,000 subjects in Japan, who thought of him as a deity.

February 9, 1927 (Wednesday)
By a 59–30 vote, the United States Senate rejected American participation in the Permanent Court of International Justice of the League of Nations, more popularly known as the "World Court".
The strongest gun control legislation  in the United States, to that time, was signed by U.S. President Calvin Coolidge.  Taking effect on May 10, the Miller Act prohibited the sending of revolvers, pistols and other small arms through the mail.  The ban was easily evaded by using private shipping companies.

February 10, 1927 (Thursday)
President Coolidge addressed a joint session of the United States Congress and announced that he would invite the world's major powers to meet in Geneva to discuss further reductions of their navies.  In 1922, the Washington Naval Treaty had been signed by the U.S., the United Kingdom, France, Italy and Japan.  As one historian noted, "The hastily conceived meeting, which [Coolidge] expected to parallel the success of the 1921-22 naval conference, turned out to be a fiasco."
The first contingent of American troops in China arrived as 300 U.S. Marines arrived at Shanghai to protect U.S. citizens there.
Jonny spielt auf, Ernst Krenek's opera about an African-American jazz musician, premiered in Leipzig and became a hit in Germany.
Born: Leontyne Price, African-American operatic soprano and prima donna, in Laurel, Mississippi (alive in 2021)
Died:  Frank S. Ryan, 46, American who at one time was known as the "prince of clairvoyants" until his nationwide ring was broken in 1914.

February 11, 1927 (Friday)
Billy Gaffney, a 4-year-old boy, was kidnapped while playing near his apartment building at 99 Fifteenth Street in Brooklyn, and was never found.  More than eight years later, convicted child murderer Albert Fish confessed to abducting and killing Gaffney.
The city of Homewood, Alabama, near Birmingham, was created by the merger of the towns of Rosedale, Edgewood and Grove Park.

February 12, 1927 (Saturday)
The first contingent of British troops landed in Shanghai to begin protection of  British citizens.  Within a week, 21 warships from the U.S., Britain, Japan, France and Italy had anchored at the Huangpu River.

February 13, 1927 (Sunday)
Three months before Charles Lindbergh's nonstop flight across the North Atlantic, two Italian army officers, Lt. Col. Francesco de Pinedo and Lt. Col. Carlo del Prete, began the longest airplane tour to that time.  Taking off from Sesto Calende in a Savoia-Marchetti S.55, de Pinedo and del Prete made fifty stops over four months in Europe, Africa, and North and South America, traveling  with 193 hours flying time.
A series of twenty earthquake tremors in one hour in Bosnia killed about 100 people in an area along the Neretva River.  While the death toll was initially believed to be 700 or more, the areas hit were sparsely populated and the loss of life was less than expected.
Died:  Brooks Adams, 78, American economic historian

February 14, 1927 (Monday)
In a 24-hour period, a winter storm dumped 11.82 meters (almost 38.78 feet) of snow on Japan's Mount Ibuki to set a new record for largest snowfall.  The event broke the previous record of 8.18 m (26.84 ft) in the Japanese town of Itakura, which had been set one day earlier.
Conn Smythe purchased the Toronto St. Patricks hockey team, preventing it from being moved to Philadelphia, and renamed it the Toronto Maple Leafs, after the Maple Leaf Regiment which fought for Canada in World War One.  As the St. Pats, the team had lost 1 to 0, on the 13th, to the Ottawa Senators, and was in last place in its division at 8-18-4.  With a new name, the Maple Leafs played their first game on the 15th in Windsor, Ontario, and lost to the Detroit Cougars (which would in 1932 be renamed the Detroit Red Wings), 5 to 1.
Boxer Jimmy Delaney defeated future light heavyweight boxing champion Maxie Rosenbloom in a bout in Cincinnati, but splintered a bone in his left elbow in the process.  After a loss the next week to Benny Ross, Delaney sought medical treatment, but would die of blood poisoning from an infection on March 4.
Born: Lois Maxwell, Canadian film actress who portrayed "Miss Moneypenny" in 14 James Bond films; in Kitchener, Ontario;  (d. 2007)
Died: 
William Gemmell, former horse racer, after jumping from this 5th floor hotel room in Butte, Montana to escape a fire 
William Vanderbilt, 70, dynamite expert, by suicide

February 15, 1927 (Tuesday)
California was struck by the worst storm in that state's history, up to that time, as hurricane force winds and torrential rains killed 24 people.  Thirteen of the dead had been employees of California Edison Company, killed when an avalanche buried their homes in the Sierra Nevada mountains.
For the first time in half a century, travel across the English Channel came to a halt, as a dense fog in England continued into its fifth day.  "Many veteran channel-commuters simply refused to believe it", noted one account.  "It had never occurred to them that such a time would come to Britain, and they hounded passenger agents with comments and queries."
Born: Harvey Korman, American comedian, in Chicago (d. 2008)

February 16, 1927 (Wednesday)
Sir Oliver Lodge conducted an experiment in telepathy on BBC Radio, asking listeners to give their impressions as a team of people concentrated on images on a set of cards.  Out of 24,659 responses, as many as 190 correctly noted that a two of clubs had been drawn, but, writes Harry Price, "it is obvious that there was no evidence of anything but pure chance". 
Mao Zedong delivered his "Report on an Investigation of the Peasant Movement in Hunan" to the Central Committee of China's fledgling Communist Party.  Summing up 32 days of interviews, Mao predicted "Within a short time, hundreds of millions of peasants will rise in Central, South, and North China, with the fury of a hurricane; no power, however strong, can restrain them."
Born: June Brown, British TV soap opera actress (Dot Cotton on EastEnders), in Needham Market, Suffolk (alive in 2021)

February 17, 1927 (Thursday)
Turkey and U.S. re-established diplomatic relations, which had been severed April 20, 1917, after the two nations were on opposite sides of World War One.

February 18, 1927 (Friday)
By voice vote, the United States Senate passed the White-Dill bill, the Radio Act of 1927.  President Coolidge signed the measure into law five days later, creating what is now the Federal Communications Commission.
Diplomatic relations Canada and United States formally began as U.S. President Coolidge received the credentials of Charles Vincent Massey, first Canadian Minister to the United States, in a half-hour ceremony at the White House.  Prior to 1927, American relations concerning Canada were conducted through the United Kingdom.
Born: John Warner, United States Senator (R-Virginia) from 1979 to 2009, and one-time husband of Elizabeth Taylor; in Washington, D.C. (d. 2021)

February 19, 1927 (Saturday)

The mass production of "frozen CO2", which "melted" more slowly than frozen water, was a milestone in transporting perishable foods, because far less of it was required—1,200 pounds of dry ice could replace 17,000 pounds of regular ice and 1,700 pounds of salt, freeing up more space for products.
Radio station CFRB began broadcasting in Toronto as the first station in the world to rely on alternating current (AC) rather than direct current (DC).
The romantic comedy film It was released, starring Clara Bow in the role that made her a major star.
Born:  Ernest Trova, American pop art sculptor, in Clayton, Missouri (d. 2009)

February 20, 1927 (Sunday)
The United States increased the number of troops committed to Nicaragua, as 800 U.S. Marines arrived at Corinto, half of a group of 1,600 that had been mobilized three days earlier.  Within the week, the American grew fivefold, from 400 to 2,000.
Born:  
Sidney Poitier, African-American film actor and director; in Miami (d. 2022)
Roy Cohn, American prosecutor during McCarthy Era; in New York City (d.1986) 
Ibrahim Ferrer, Cuban singer; in San Luis, Santiago de Cuba (d. 2005) 
Hubert de Givenchy, French fashion designer, in Beauvais (d. 2018)

February 21, 1927 (Monday)
Nicaragua's President Adolfo Díaz asked that his nation become a protectorate of the United States, and proposed to sign a 100-year treaty to allow American troops to occupy the Central American  nation.  President Coolidge declined to take the offer seriously, but U.S. troops remained in Nicaragua until 1933.
In its decision in Farrington v. Tokushige, the United States Supreme Court invalidated, as unconstitutional, a law in Hawaii that required schools to receive a license from the state before they could teach any languages other than English.
The city of West Vernon, Texas, was incorporated.  It existed until 1944, when it was annexed into Vernon, Texas.
Born: Erma Bombeck, American humorist and newspaper columnist (At Wit's End), in Bellbrook, Ohio (d. 1996)

February 22, 1927 (Tuesday)
The distance was slightly more than one third of the  distance between New York and Paris, subject of the Orteig Prize, which would be awarded for the first transatlantic crossing between two continents.

February 23, 1927 (Wednesday)
Werner Heisenberg wrote a 14-page letter to fellow physicist Wolfgang Pauli, describing for the first time a key concept in quantum mechanics that would become known as the Heisenberg uncertainty principle.
The Radio Act of 1927 was signed into law by U.S. President Coolidge.
Born: Régine Crespin, French opera soprano, in Marseille (d. 2007)

February 24, 1927 (Thursday)
The Fox Film Corporation gave its first demonstration of the process that it would use for a new feature, Movietone News, that would allow filmgoers to see and hear scenes from recent events.  Fifty reporters were escorted into Fox-Case's New York studios at 10:00 that morning and filmed.  Four hours later, the same group saw and heard themselves when the film of the press conference was screened.
Died:  William Fuld, 56, inventor of the Ouija Board, after falling from the roof of a three-story building.

February 25, 1927 (Friday)
The McFadden Act was signed into law by U.S. President Coolidge, prohibiting commercial banks from establishing branches in more than one state.  The act would not be completely repealed until 1994, when the Riegle-Neal Act was passed.
On the same day, President Coolidge vetoed the McNary–Haugen Farm Relief Bill, which had passed the Senate 47-39, and the House of Representatives 214-178.  Congress failed to override the veto, as well as being unable to overcome a second veto of a new version in 1928.  Domestic farm price supports would become law in 1933.

February 26, 1927 (Saturday)
Instant communication between San Francisco and London (and by extension, the Western United States and Europe), was first achieved at 7:30 am Pacific time and 3:30 pm GMT. In 1915, the two men had spoken during the first phone conversation between San Francisco and New York. "The inauguration of this service", noted one account, "completes the final tie-up in trans-atlantic radio telephone service between the entire United States and England, Scotland and Wales."
Born:  
Mark Lane, American lawyer and author who challenged the Warren Commission findings on the Kennedy assassination, in New York City (d. 2016) 
Tom Kennedy, American TV game show host (Name That Tune); as James Narz in Louisville, Kentucky (d. 2020)

February 27, 1927 (Sunday)
In what one author described as "a milestone in the evolution of Afro-Asian solidarity", the first Congress of Oppressed Nationalists opened in Brussels.  Among the delegates who would one day lead their people to independence were Jawaharlal Nehru (India), Ho Chi Minh (Vietnam), Mohammed Hatta (Indonesia) and Léopold Sédar Senghor (Senegal).

February 28, 1927 (Monday)
Charles Lindbergh arrived at the factory of Ryan Airlines in San Diego, placed the order for the construction of what would become one of the most famous airplanes in history, the Spirit of St. Louis, then remained in the city during the craft's construction.

References

1927
1927-02
1927-02